Cedrik-Marcel Stebe was the defending champion but chose to participate at the 2012 US Open instead.
Dudi Sela won the final 6–1, 7–5 against Yuichi Sugita.

Seeds

Draw

Finals

Top half

Bottom half

References
 Main Draw
 Qualifying Draw

Singles
Chang-Sat Bangkok Open - Singles
 in Thai tennis